The Ghost and the Whale is a 2017 American mystery thriller drama film directed by Anthony Gaudioso and James Gaudioso and starring Maurice Benard and Tippi Hedren.

Cast
Maurice Benard as Joseph Hawthorne
Jonathan Pryce as Whale (voice)
Ashlynn Yennie as Anne
Monica Keena as Dr. Sweetie Jones
Tippi Hedren as Tippi
James Gaudioso as Ed Hale
Anthony Gaudioso as Jack Lee

References

External links
 
 

American mystery films
American thriller films
American drama films
2010s English-language films
2010s American films